Heinz Plumanns (June 26, 1902 – January 11, 1986) was a German diver who competed in the 1928 Summer Olympics.

He was born in Cologne and died in Bad Neuenahr-Ahrweiler.

In 1928 he finished eighth in the 3 metre springboard competition.

External links

1902 births
1986 deaths
German male divers
Olympic divers of Germany
Divers at the 1928 Summer Olympics
Sportspeople from Cologne
20th-century German people